The Lake Victoria deepwater catfish (Xenoclarias eupogon) is a species of catfish (order Siluriformes) of the family Clariidae. It is monotypic within the genus Xenoclarias. This species is endemic to Lake Victoria, and is found in deeper areas of the lake, from 
. This species is threatened with extinction or may already be extinct due to predation by the introduced Nile perch as well as other recent ecological changes. This species grows to about  SL.

References

Xenoclarias
Freshwater fish of Kenya
Fish of Lake Victoria
Monotypic fish genera
Fish described in 1928
Taxonomy articles created by Polbot